The 34th Karlovy Vary International Film Festival took place from 2 to 10 July 1999. The Crystal Globe was won by Yana's Friends, an Israeli comedy-drama film directed by Arik Kaplun. The second prize, the Special Jury Prize was won by Show Me Love, a Swedish comedy-drama film directed by Lukas Moodysson. French film director and scriptwriter Yves Boisset was the president of the jury.

Jury
The following people formed the jury of the festival: 
 Yves Boisset, Jury President (France)
 Jaroslav Brabec (Spain)
 Jutta Brückner (Germany)
 Dan Fainaru (Israel)
 Katinka Faragó  (Sweden)
 Brian Gilbert (UK)
 Karen Šachnazarov (Russia)

Official selection awards
The following feature films and people received the official selection awards:
 Crystal Globe (Grand Prix) - Yana's Friends (Ha-Chaverim Shel Yana) by Arik Kaplun (Israel)
 Special Jury Prize - Show Me Love (Fucking Åmål) by Lukas Moodysson (Sweden)
 Best Director Award - Aleksandr Rogozhkin for Checkpoint (Blokpost) (Russia)
 Best Actress Award - Evelyn Kaplun for her role in Yana's Friends (Ha-Chaverim Shel Yana) (Israel)
 Best Actor Award - Hilmar Thate for his role in Paths in the Night (Wege in die Nacht) (Germany)
 Special Jury Mention - Cosy Dens (Pelíšky) by Jan Hřebejk (Czech Republic)

Other statutory awards
Other statutory awards that were conferred at the festival:
 Crystal Globe for Outstanding Artistic Contribution to World Cinema - Karel Kachyňa (Czech Republic), Franco Zeffirelli (Italy)
 Award of the Town of Karlovy Vary - Nikita Michalkov (Russia)
 Audience Award - Show Me Love (Fucking Åmål) by Lukas Moodysson (Sweden)

Non-statutory awards
The following non-statutory awards were conferred at the festival:
 FIPRESCI International Critics Award: Cosy Dens (Pelíšky) by Jan Hřebejk (Czech Republic)
 Special Mention: Drop Dead Gorgeous by Michael Patrick Jann (USA)
 FICC - The Don Quixote Prize: Show Me Love (Fucking Åmål) by Lukas Moodysson (Sweden)
 Special Mention: Girl on the Bridge (La fille sur le pont) by  Patrice Leconte (France)
 Ecumenical Jury Award: A Reasonable Man by Gavin Hood (South Africa, France)
 Special Mention: Yana's Friends (Ha-Chaverim Shel Yana) by Arik Kaplun (Israel) & Beautiful People by Jasmin Dizdar (UK)
 Philip Morris Film Award: The Outskirts (Okraina) by Pyotr Lutsik (Russia)
 Emila Radoka Award: Helluva Good Luck (Z pekla štěstí) by  Zdeněk Troška (Czech Republic)

References

1999 film awards
Karlovy Vary International Film Festival